Pir Dezgah (also Romanized as Pīr Dezgāh; also known as Dezgāh) is a village in Borborud-e Gharbi Rural District, in the Central District of Aligudarz County, Lorestan Province, Iran. At the 2006 census, its population was 252, in 44 families.

References 

Towns and villages in Aligudarz County